Gaumont State Cinema is a Grade II* listed Art Deco theatre located in Kilburn, a district in northwest London.

Building
Designed by George Coles and commissioned and built by Phillip and Sid Hyams, the cinema opened in 1937.  The Gaumont State was one of the biggest auditoria in Europe, with seating for 4,004 people. The name State is said to come from the huge  tower, inspired by the Empire State Building in New York City. The exterior of the cinema is designed in an Art Deco Italian Renaissance style, covered in cream ceramic tiles. The tower, designed in the style of a 1930s New York skyscraper, can be seen for miles around, and bears the name "STATE" in large red neon letters. The interior was designed in the opulent style of cinemas of the day, and includes a Wurlitzer organ which is today one of the largest fully functioning Wurlitzer organs in Britain. It is also one of the few cinema organs remaining in their original locations.

History
Entertainers such as Gracie Fields, Larry Adler and George Formby performed at the official opening broadcast live on BBC Radio on 20 December 1937. Since then, the Gaumont State has been one of the most popular music venues in London and hosted a number of historic performances. From the late 1980s until 2007 the building was run as a bingo hall by Mecca Bingo. In 2007 the bingo was closed, and the building and surrounding site were put up for sale. A campaign to Save the Kilburn State from unsympathetic property developers, and restore it as a cultural centre, was started in the same year by local residents.
The building was eventually acquired by Ruach City Church, led by Bishop John Anthony Francis and Co-Pastor Penny Francis. The building was bought 70 years to the exact day that The Gaumont State was first opened on 20 December 1937.

Noteworthy performances

 Django Reinhardt (23 July 1938 & 14 August 1939)
 Dinah Shore (5 September 1948)
 Nellie Lutcher (29 October 1950)
 Deep River Boys (12 November 1950)
 Petula Clark (12 November 1950)
 Frank Sinatra (21 June 1953)
 Lee Konitz (1957)
 Jerry Lee Lewis (25 May 1958)
 Duke Ellington (25 October 1958)
 Buddy Holly (2 March 1958)
 Ella Fitzgerald and the Oscar Peterson Trio (11 April 1965)
 Thelonious Monk (7 May 1961)
 Art Blakey (7 May 1961)
 Lee Morgan (7 May 1961)
 Dizzy Gillespie (11 November 1961)
 John Coltrane (11 November 1961)
 Dave Brubeck (1963)
 The Beatles (9 April 1963 & 23 October 1964)
 The Rolling Stones (19 November 1963)
 Jethro Tull (26–28 February 1971)
 David Bowie (13 June 1973)
 Ronnie Wood (14 July 1974)
 The Faces (13–14 July 1974 & 21–22 December 1974)
 Deep Purple (22 May 1974)
 Black Sabbath (21 November 1975)
 The Who (15 December 1977)
 Bill Haley & His Comets
 Count Basie
 Harry Belafonte
 Louis Armstrong
 Sarah Vaughan
 Tom Jones

See also
 The Who at Kilburn: 1977
 The First Barbarians: Live from Kilburn
 Deep Purple Live in London

References

External links 

 History and Archive Material on the Gaumont State

Grade II* listed buildings in the London Borough of Brent
Buildings and structures completed in 1937
Art Deco architecture in London
Former cinemas in London
Kilburn, London
Public venues with a theatre organ